Matilde Gioli (born Matilde Lojacono on 2 September 1989) is an Italian television and film actress.

Life and career 
Born in Milan,  Gioli graduated in philosophy from the University of Milan, and then worked as an event hostess and a synchronized swimming instructor. 

With no previous acting experiences, she won an audition for the role of Serena Ossola in Paolo Virzì's Human Capital, and for her performance she won the Guglielmo Biraghi Award at the 69th Silver Ribbon Awards.

Filmography

Film

Television

References

External links  
 

1989 births
Living people 
Actresses from Milan
Italian film actresses 
Italian television actresses
21st-century Italian actresses
Nastro d'Argento winners
University of Milan alumni
People of Apulian descent
People of Tuscan descent